Stadionul Anghel Iordănescu is a multi-use stadium in Voluntari, Ilfov county, Romania. It is used mostly for football matches and is the home ground of FC Voluntari since 2012. The stadium holds 4,600 people.

The stadium was named after legendary Romanian manager, Anghel Iordănescu.

References

 

Football venues in Romania
Buildings and structures in Ilfov County